Carlos Alberto Jirón Bolaños (c. 1955 – 19 May 2020) was a Nicaraguan politician. He was elected to the National Assembly in November 2016 as a representative of the Constitutionalist Liberal Party from León. Jirón died on 19 May 2020, due to complications of diabetes, aged 65.

References

Date of birth missing
1955 births
2020 deaths
Members of the National Assembly (Nicaragua)
Constitutionalist Liberal Party politicians
People from León, Nicaragua